In an electric power transmission line, a suspension tower is where the conductors are simply suspended from the tower, the mechanical tension being the same on each side.

In this case, the tower is supposed to carry a downward force, and a lateral force, but not a longitudinal force.

These may have, for each conductor, an insulator string hanging down from the tower, or two strings making a "V" shape. In either case, sometimes several insulator strings are used in parallel to give higher mechanical strength.
These are used where a transmission line continues in a straight line, or turns through a small angle. In other cases, a tension tower  (C or D Towers) is used.

See also
 Dead-end tower
 Transposition tower

Pylons